NH 121 may refer to:

 National Highway 121 (India)
 New Hampshire Route 121, United States